The Patrick Wolf EP is the debut EP of English-Irish singer-songwriter Patrick Wolf, limited to 1000 copies. The songs, "Bloodbeat" and "A Boy Like Me" would go on to appear on Lycanthropy, Wolf's debut album. "Empress" features a music box playing the lullaby Frere Jacques throughout.

This EP features Leo Chadburn (recorder), Joe Zeitlin (cello) and handclaps from ‘the Special Lady Crew’. Wolf uses: Maplewood grand piano, viola, violin, accordion, and programming on this EP.

Track listing 
 "Bloodbeat" - 3:46
 "Empress" - 3:55
 "A Boy Like Me" - 3:26
 "Pumpkin Soup" - 5:01

References

2002 debut EPs
Patrick Wolf albums